James Thomas Foster (born August 18, 1971) is an American baseball coach and former catcher, who is the current head coach of Northwestern Wildcats. He played college baseball for the Providence Friars from 1990 to 1993. He served as the head coach of the Rhode Island Rams (2006–2014) and the Army Black Knights (2017–2022).

Early life and playing career
Born in Warwick, Rhode Island, Foster attended Bishop Hendricken High School and Providence College and played at catcher on the Providence Friars baseball team under Paul Kostacopoulos, where he was named MVP of the 1992 Big East Conference baseball tournament. As a senior in 1993, Foster had the Friars' best batting average at .386, in addition to 61 hits, 38 RBI, and seven homers.

Selected by the Baltimore Orioles in the 22nd round of the 1993 MLB draft, Foster played for the Orioles organization from 1993 to 1999, starting with the Bluefield Orioles. In 1999 and 2000, Foster also played for the Anaheim Angels, Arizona Diamondbacks, and Chicago White Sox organizations. He ended his professional baseball career with the Birmingham Barons and Charlotte Knights in 2000. Foster was a Topps All-Rookie honoree in 1993 and Baseball Weekly Minor League Catcher of the Year in 1997.

Coaching career
In 2004 and 2005, Foster was an assistant coach at Brown University.

Foster served as head baseball coach at the University of Rhode Island from 2006 to 2014, compiling a record of 268–230–3. The 2006 and 2013 Rhode Island teams won Atlantic 10 Conference regular season titles. Following a 13–40 season, Foster resigned on July 17, 2014 with three years remaining on his contract to accept the associate head coach job with Boston College.

Foster served as associate head coach at Boston College in 2015 and 2016 under Mike Gambino.

Foster was named head baseball coach at the United States Military Academy on June 23, 2016. After a 25–31 season in 2017, Army won both the  Patriot League regular season and tournament titles in 2018 and qualified for the NCAA Tournament. In the NCAA tournament, Army went 1–2 in the regional round, including a 5–1 upset of regional host and nationally ranked NC State on opening day.

On June 28, 2022, Foster was named the head baseball coach of the Northwestern Wildcats.

Head coaching record

References

External links

 Army profile
 Rhode Island profile

1971 births
Living people
Albany Polecats players
American expatriate baseball players in Canada
Army Black Knights baseball coaches
Baseball catchers
Baseball outfielders
Baseball coaches from Rhode Island
Baseball players from Rhode Island
Birmingham Barons players
Bluefield Orioles players
Boston College Eagles baseball coaches
Bowie Baysox players
Brown Bears baseball coaches
Charlotte Knights players
Edmonton Trappers players
Erie SeaWolves players
Frederick Keys players
Northwestern Wildcats baseball coaches
Providence Friars baseball players
Rochester Red Wings players
Rhode Island Rams baseball coaches
Sportspeople from Warwick, Rhode Island
Tucson Sidewinders players
Bishop Hendricken High School alumni